Traian is a commune located in Brăila County, Muntenia, Romania. It is composed of four villages: Căldărușa, Silistraru, Traian and Urleasca.

References

Communes in Brăila County
Localities in Muntenia